Phoebe Eng (born ) is an Asian American national lecturer on race and social justice issues who has been featured in several publications, including The New York Times, The Wall Street Journal, and Newsweek. She is the author of Warrior Lessons: An Asian American Woman's Journey into Power, a memoir discussing how to empower Asian American women.

Personal life
Eng grew up on Long Island, New York. Her father's family is from Hong Kong, while her mother's family is from Taiwan. She and her family lived in a predominantly Jewish American neighborhood in Westbury, and they were relatively isolated from the large Chinese American community in New York City: she and her younger sister were the only Asian Americans in their school. Her first experience being around large numbers of other Asian Americans was when she left home to attend the University of California, Berkeley.

After her graduation from UC Berkeley, she returned to her home state to attend the New York University School of Law, driven by what she described as "pressure to earn a recognizable badge of approval" (her mother told her that she wanted her "to learn the language of power"), as well as encouragement from Sharon Hom, who convinced her to apply. During her time there, she was involved with efforts to pressure the school administration regarding issues of racism and diversity on campus; Eng, L. Londell McMillan, and nine other students met with then-dean John Sexton to propose the creation of a committee to investigate racial bias, plans to admit more minority students and hire more minority faculty, and a course on race relations and the law.

Eng married photographer Zubin Shroff in 1994. Shroff was on assignment in Fogo, Cabo Verde, for Travel + Leisure magazine in 1997 when he fell into a dormant volcano that he was photographing there. Eng arranged for his medical evacuation to London and flew there to accompany him during his surgery and subsequent recovery. As a result, she had to extend the deadline on her book, Warrior Lessons.

Career
Eng started her career as a mergers and acquisitions lawyer with the firm Coudert Brothers in New York and Hong Kong. She resigned from that position to join A. Magazine, which launched nationally in  August 1993. Describing her motivations in an interview with Richard Heffner on The Open Mind, she stated, "it’s very necessary for Asian-Americans to own their own media, to own their own stations, for instance, to put forth the views in their own voices".

In 2002, after the closure of A. Magazine, Eng became a director of the Social Change Communication Project, a research initiative sponsored by the Ms. Foundation for Women. In 2005, she co-founded the national policy and communications group, The Opportunity Agenda, with Alan Jenkins, Brian D. Smedley, and Bill Lann Lee, and served as the organization's creative director. In 2006, she was named to a four-year term on the board of directors of the Ms. Foundation for Women, a national women's philanthropic organization. In 2007 her creative team formed Creative Counsel, which develops projects that connect creative professionals and artists to social justice causes.

She was also an initial and co-founding member of the Asian Women Leadership Network, now the largest network of professional Asian American women in the country, and was a Founding Sister of both the Asian Women's Center (formerly Asian Pacific American Women's Leadership Network) and the National Asian Pacific American Women's Forum, based in Washington, D.C.

Works
Eng's writing has focused on the themes of women's empowerment, and social, racial, and environmental justice. Her 1999 book Warrior Lessons: An Asian American Woman's Journey into Power was reviewed by various publications including The New York Times, Kirkus Reviews, and Ricepaper.

She contributed the foreword to Yell-oh Girls! (2001), edited by Vickie Nam, and has contributed writings to several books and journals, including: The Greatness of Girls (2001), "Language is a Place of Struggle" (2008), Close to Home: Case Studies of Human Rights Work in the United States (2004), That Takes Ovaries! Bold Females and Their Brazen Acts (2002), Closing the Leadership Gap (2004), and the National Civic Review (2009).

References

External links
Viewpoint From Phoebe Eng: Fifth Generation Chinese American on Watching the China Olympics
APA Women's Collegiate Conference - Speakers
Women Working - Success Strategies For Women - Phoebe Eng
The Opportunity Agenda Advisory Board
Creative Counsel
Trouble the Water: Recovery and Resistance in New Orleans. - a blog hosted by Phoebe Eng and Brian Drolet.

American writers of Chinese descent
University of California, Berkeley alumni
New York University School of Law alumni
1960s births
Living people